Hemixylota is a genus of hoverflies in the family Syrphidae.

Species
Hemixylota incerta Shannon & Aubertin, 1933
Hemixylota unicolor Shannon & Aubertin, 1933
Hemixylota varipes Shannon & Aubertin, 1933

References

Eristalinae
Diptera of South America
Hoverfly genera
Taxa named by Raymond Corbett Shannon